The  slender snake (Galvarinus tarmensis) is a genus of snake in the family Colubridae.

It is found in Peru.

References 

Galvarinus
Reptiles described in 1945
Reptiles of Peru
Snakes of South America